A solid-state fan is a device used to produce an airflow with no moving parts. Such a device may use the principle of electro-aerodynamic pumping, which is based on corona discharge.

It has advantages over mechanical fans such as that it is noiseless and more reliable.

References 

Cooling technology